Vähäheikkilä (Finnish; Lillheikkilä in Swedish) is a district of the city of Turku, in Finland. It is located to the south of the city centre, between Martti and Puistomäki. Despite the district's name it has nothing to do with Iso-Heikkilä, which is located on the other side of the city centre.

The current population of Vähäheikkilä is 1,153, and it is decreasing at an annual rate of 3.90%. 18.82% of the district's population are under 15 years old, while 15.00% are over 65. The district's linguistic makeup is 91.41% Finnish, 6.50% Swedish, and 2.08% other.

See also
 Districts of Turku
 Districts of Turku by population

Districts of Turku